Miliusa macrocarpa is a species of plant in the family Annonaceae, that is native to Nepal and India.

References

macrocarpa